Dohwa Station is a subway station in Nam-gu, Incheon, South Korea, operated by Korail. It was opened in 2001.

References

Metro stations in Incheon
Seoul Metropolitan Subway stations
Michuhol District
Railway stations opened in 2001